The Town of Brookhaven is the most populous of the ten towns of Suffolk County, New York, United States. Part of the New York metropolitan area, it is located approximately 50 miles from Manhattan. It is the largest of the state of New York's 932 towns by area (when water area is included), and the second most populous after the Town of Hempstead.

The first settlement in what is now Brookhaven was known as Setauket. Founded as a group of agricultural hamlets in the mid-17th century, Brookhaven first expanded as a major center of shipbuilding in the 19th century.  Its proximity to New York City facilitated the establishment of resort communities, followed by a post-war population boom. In the 2020 census record, Brookhaven contained 485,773 people.

The township is home to two renowned research centers, Stony Brook University and Brookhaven National Laboratory. Combined these two research  centers are approximately 50% of the Town's top ten employer's employee count. Tourism is also a major part of the local economy. The largest traditional downtowns are located in Port Jefferson, a regional transportation hub, and Patchogue. The area has long been serviced by the Long Island Rail Road and Bridgeport & Port Jefferson Ferry.

History

Origins and etymology

The first known inhabitants were Algonquian-speaking Native Americans, of the Setauket and Unkechaug tribes. The first English settlers arrived around 1640, and in 1655, several purchased Brookhaven's land from its tribal inhabitants. The latter founding year was recognized in 1976, when the Brookhaven Town Bicentennial Commission proposed setting the date on the seal to 1655 in line with this first deed of settlement of the town of Brookhaven at Setauket on April 14, 1655. Considering this founding year of 1655, Brookhaven is the fifth English township on Long Island following Southampton, Southold, Huntington, and East Hampton.

The first English settlement was named "Setauket" after the Native American tribe. The names "Brookhaven" and "Setauket" were initially used interchangeably to describe the village or the town. The verbal division between the smaller hamlet of Setauket and township of Brookhaven was not set until well into the 19th century. A point of confusion is the existence of the hamlet named Brookhaven, which was in fact named for the township in 1879. Other names used in the settlement's first decades were "Ashford", after Ashford, Kent, in England, and "Cromwell Bay", for English Protestant leader Oliver Cromwell.

The original purchase from the native Setalcott tribe that took place in 1655 encompassed the land making up present-day Setauket, Stony Brook, and Port Jefferson. A second purchase was made by Richard Woodhull in 1664 expanded this tract eastward along the North Shore to additionally include all lands from the Old Mans area (Mount Sinai and Miller Place) to Wading River. Richard Woodhull was the direct heir of Eustace de Vesci, a British noble who was a signator of the Magna Charta. Another land purchase in the same year expanded Brookhaven to the South Shore of Long Island.

Brookhaven was integrated into the Province of New York following that colony's establishment in 1664, and in 1666 Governor Richard Nicolls granted a patent for the town which confirmed title to the lands purchased.  Governor Thomas Dongan issued a patent in 1686 which granted powers to the town and established a representative form of government. The town seal was authorized at this time. The central element of the town seal, the letter “D”, was designated to the Town of Brookhaven as its official cattle earmark by the Duke's Laws of 1665. Although no records exist dating to the town seal's original design plan, it is generally thought that the seal's olive branch signified peace and the whaling tools signified the most lucrative business in the Town of Brookhaven at the time. The current seal is a redesign, retaining the original elements, but adding the Town of Brookhaven and its 1655 date of settlement.

Colonial era
Early English settlers farmed, fished, and hunted whales. Brookhaven was largely agrarian, with each hamlet being limited to a handful of families yet containing miles of land.  This economy was supplemented in coastal sections with fishing.  A major commercial center did non exist in Brookhaven until the early 19th century.

Brookhaven was founded primarily by English colonists that partook in the settlement of Southold, and was likewise under the jurisdiction of the theocratic New Haven Colony in the modern state of Connecticut. Brookhaven was transferred to the more secular Hartford-led Connecticut Colony in 1662. Following the English takeover of New Netherland in 1664, the new English colony of New York laid claim to Long Island and brought Brookhaven into its jurisdiction.

American Revolutionary War
During the early stages of the American Revolutionary War, Brookhaven and the rest of Long Island were captured by British forces, and many residents sided with the British as loyalists to the English crown. Nevertheless, Brookhaven had multiple episodes of celebrated American activity during the war. This included the actions of the Culper Spy Ring, a spy network working for George Washington that largely consisted of Brookhaveners working in occupied territory. Another episode was Benjamin Tallmadge's successful raid from across Long Island to the British stronghold at the Manor St. George, wherein his raiding party rowed from Connecticut to Cedar Beach and marched across Long Island, culminating in the Battle of Fort St. George and burning of the defensive structure. A more minor skirmish occurred within the settlement of Setauket, where the British had repurposed the local Protestant church as a fortress. Gunshots were fired and some bullet holes remain within the walls of the adjacent Caroline Church.

Development

In the mid-19th century, several communities in Brookhaven prospered as shipbuilding ports.  The most successful of those were the villages of Port Jefferson and Patchogue, which remain the township's most bustling traditional downtowns.  Whaling and cordwood industries also developed in Brookhaven.

Railroads reached Brookhaven in the mid-19th century, beginning in 1843 with trains reaching inland to Ronkonkoma. The earliest equivalent to the North Shore's present-day Port Jefferson Branch began operation in 1873. The Bridgeport & Port Jefferson Ferry has been operating between Port Jefferson and Bridgeport, Connecticut, since 1888 and was partly founded by legendary circus-master P.T. Barnum.

From the end of the late 19th century until the middle of the 20th, many communities along the North Shore and South Shore became successful resort towns. These hosted many urban residents from nearby New York City, including numerous celebrities of the era, during the summer months.  Meanwhile, many rural sections across Brookhaven served as campgrounds for youth clubs.

During the Gilded Age, Brookhaven underwent some of the same changes that affected Long Island's Gold Coast. Waterfront areas along the North Shore, including Belle Terre and Old Field, transformed from small fishing communities into fashionable and exclusive enclaves of the moneyed elite.

A variety of notable research occurred in Brookhaven around the turn of the 20th century. Inventor Nikola Tesla had a research center in Shoreham, which featured the large Wardenclyffe Tower. As of 2016, this site was being renovated as the Tesla Science Center at Wardenclyffe. Guglielmo Marconi opened one of the world's largest radio facilities, known as RCA's Radio Central, in Rocky Point.

Modern history 
In the post-war era, Brookhaven experienced a massive population boom.  This was partly due to its proximity to New York City along the Long Island Rail Road and the highway system of Robert Moses. The township's most internationally renowned institutions, Stony Brook University and Brookhaven National Lab, both date to the years following World War II.
 
During the mid-century, a number of major transformations were conducted by philanthropist Ward Melville in the "Three Village" area (The Setaukets, Stony Brook, and Old Field). Melville, an Old Field resident and owner of what later became CVS Corporation, used his fortune to transform Northwestern Brookhaven to his vision of an idealized New England-style region.  To this end, he ordered the construction in 1939 of the Stony Brook Village Center, a picturesque commercial center set on village green in Stony Brook, with clapboard buildings designed to look as if they had colonial origins.  In 1962, Ward Melville donated 400 acres of land for the relocation of now-named Stony Brook University from Oyster Bay.

Brookhaven National Laboratory (BNL) sits on the site of Camp Upton, a United States army installation that was used as a training ground in World War I and World War II by thousands of soldiers including composer Irving Berlin. In 1946 ownership of the grounds was transferred for use by the new national laboratory, which began operating the following year.  Brookhaven researchers have since made such diverse contributions as patenting Maglev, designing one of the first video games, detecting the first solar neutrinos, designing pollutant-eating bacteria, creating the first PET scan, and various contributions to particle physics.  The laboratory contains the Relativistic Heavy Ion Collider (RHIC) and the National Synchrotron Light Source.  Noted physicist and Nobel laureate I.I. Rabi was instrumental in the national laboratory's establishment.

Geography
Brookhaven is located centrally on the geographic Long Island and extends from the North Shore to the South Shore. According to the United States Census Bureau, the town has a total area of 531.5 square miles (1,376.6 km2), of which 259.3 square miles (671.6 km2) is land and 272.2 square miles (705.1 km2 or 51.22%) is water. It is the largest town in New York in terms of total area, excluding water. However, there are four towns in the state with more land area: Arietta in Hamilton County, Long Lake in Hamilton County, Ohio in Herkimer County and Webb in Herkimer County.

Brookhaven is bounded to the north by the Long Island Sound, and to the south by the Atlantic Ocean. Riverhead and Southampton to the east, and Smithtown and Islip to the west.

A large part of Fire Island (accessible by a bridge at Smith Point) and the Great South Bay are in the town.

Bald Hill, a large hill in the hamlet of Farmingville, marks where the glacier which formed Long Island stopped. At the top of Bald Hill is a Vietnam veterans memorial.

Climate

Physical features
Outer Barrier
Fire Island
Great South Bay
Patchogue Bay
Bellport Bay
Narrow Bay
Moriches Bay

Demographics

As of the 2020 United States census, there were 485,773 people residing in the town. The racial makeup of the town was 83.0% White (including 72.0% Non-Hispanic whites), 6.1% Black or African American, 0.1% Native American, 4.7% Asian, 0.1% Pacific Islander,  and 3.8% from two or more races. Hispanic or Latino people of any race were 15.6% of the population.

Economy

According to Brookhaven's 2009 Comprehensive Annual Financial Report, the top employers in the town are:

Attractions
 Baseball Heaven in Yaphank
 Cupsogue Beach County Park
 Manor St. George in Shirley
 Old Field Point Light in Old Field
 Smith Haven Mall in Lake Grove
 Smith Point County Park in Shirley/Mastic Beach
 Southaven County Park in South Haven
 Splish Splash water park in Calverton
 Stony Brook Village Center in Stony Brook
 Watch Hill
 Wertheim National Wildlife Refuge
 William Floyd House in Mastic Beach

Government and politics

Patchogue was the town seat of Brookhaven until 1986, when it moved to Medford and then its current location near Bald Hill in Farmingville.

Brookhaven is led by a town supervisor and a six-member town council, which are all four-year term elected positions. Council members have been elected by district since a referendum in 2002.

Prior to 2002, the local Republican Party for the Town of Brookhaven nearly controlled the entirety of the town board for several decades, except for a four-year period in the mid-1970s when Democrats held a majority under Supervisor John Randolph.

This one-party domination, and a series of scandals, led to a tarnished reputation of local politics and accorded the nickname "Crookhaven".

After the referendum was passed In 2002, Steve Fiore-Rosenfield became the first Democrat to be elected since the 1970s in 2003.

In 2005, Brian X. Foley, a Democratic county legislator, won the town supervisor race. Constance Kepert and Carol Bissonette were also elected to the town board. With the re-election of Fiore-Rosenfield the Democrats gained control of the Brookhaven town board for the first time since the 1970s.

In 2007, councilwoman Carol Bissonette chose not to pursue re-election, but to instead run for the open receiver of taxes seat. Her district, the sixth, was won by Republican Keith Romaine, returning the town to a 4-3 majority on the town board. The new majority opted to elect councilman Tim Mazzei as majority leader.

In 2008, Brian X. Foley was elected to the New York state senate. As per New York state law his seat was declared vacant, a special election was held on March 31, 2009, to replace him. Democrat Mark Lesko. defeated Majority Leader Mazzei to become Supervisor. In August 2012, Lesko chose to step down and join a tech company on Long Island. A special election was held on November 6, 2012, which was won by Republican county legislator Edward P. Romaine, who had previously served as county clerk. With Romaine's victory and the subsequent victories of Daniel Losquadro in 2013 for the special election of highway superintendent, and Independence party member Donna Lent to town clerk, the Republican party and its endorsed allies won all townwide seats for the first time since former supervisor John Jay LaValle.

In presidential politics the town of Brookhaven is often considered the bellwether for presidential results in Suffolk County. In the past four elections Brookhaven has voted for the winner of Suffolk County. With a population of almost 500,000, Brookhaven represents 1/3rd of the vote in Suffolk County. The Democratic party picked up narrow victories in the elections of 2004, 2008, and 2012. In 2016, Donald Trump defeated Democrat Hillary Clinton by 13.52 points or a margin of 54-40 (including third parties). This was the first victory for a Republican candidate in both Brookhaven and Suffolk County as a whole since 1992 when the town voted for George H. W. Bush over Bill Clinton. Brookhaven continued its Republican swing in 2020 voting for Donald Trump again by a reduced margin.

Communities and locations

Villages (incorporated) 
Brookhaven has eight villages:
Belle Terre
Bellport
Lake Grove
Old Field
Patchogue
Poquott
Port Jefferson
Shoreham

Hamlets (unincorporated) 
Brookhaven includes all or part of approximately 50 hamlets.  One of those hamlets is also named Brookhaven.

Blue Point
Brookhaven
Calverton (mostly in Town of Riverhead)
Center Moriches
Centereach
Cherry Grove
Coram
Davis Park
East Moriches
East Patchogue
East Setauket
East Shoreham
Eastport (partially, with Town of Southampton)
Farmingville
Fire Island Pines
Gordon Heights
Hagerman
Holbrook (mostly in Town of Islip)
Holtsville (small part in Town of Islip)
Lake Ronkonkoma (small parts in Towns of Islip and Smithtown)
Manorville (small part in Town of Riverhead)
Mastic
Mastic Beach (Mastic Beach, previously an incorporated village which was dissolved 11:59 PM on December 31, 2017)
Medford
Middle Island
Miller Place
Moriches
Mount Sinai
North Bellport
North Patchogue
Ocean Bay Park
Port Jefferson Station
Point O'Woods
Ridge
Rocky Point
Ronkonkoma (mostly in Town of Islip)
Selden
Setauket
Shirley
Sound Beach
South Haven
Stony Brook
Strongs Neck
Upton
Wading River (mostly in Town of Riverhead)
Water Island
West Manor
Yaphank

Other communities

Bayberry Dunes
Bellview Beach
Canaan Lake
Coram Hill
Crystal Brook
East Yaphank
Hallock Landing
Old Mastic
Poospatuck Reservation
Rocky Point Landing
Patchogue Highlands
Siegfried Park
South Manor
South Medford
South Setauket
South Yaphank
Squassux Landing
Smith Point
Wading River Landing
West Yaphank
Woodhull Landing
East Selden (Selden)

Education

Brookhaven is the home of Stony Brook University, which moved to Stony Brook from its original Oyster Bay campus in 1962; the university has since become the town's largest employer. The town is home to the first and largest campus of Suffolk County Community College, located in Selden. The town is also home to The Stony Brook School, a Christian college prep and boarding school in Stony Brook.

Transportation

Major roads

 Interstate 495
 New York State Route 25A
  New York State Route 25
  New York State Route 24
  New York State Route 27
  New York State Route 112
  New York State Route 347
 County Route 16
  Montauk Highway, including County Route 85 and County Route 80
 County Route 97
 County Route 83
 County Route 46
 County Route 51
 County Route 111

Bus service
The Town of Brookhaven is served primarily by Suffolk County Transit bus routes, although the Village of Patchogue has its own bus service.

Railroad lines
Long Island Rail Road has three lines running through the Town of Brookhaven. The Main Line includes Ronkonkoma station, which not only serves as a major transportation hub, but is also located on the Islip-Brookhaven Town Line. On the North Shore of the town, the Port Jefferson Branch contains two stations as it enters from the Town of Smithtown: Stony Brook station along the northern edge of SUNY at Stony Brook, and Port Jefferson station along Main Street where the line terminates.

Ferries
The primary ferry within the Town of Brookhaven is the Bridgeport-Port Jefferson Ferry, which takes vehicles and passengers across the Long Island Sound to and from Port Jefferson to Bridgeport, Connecticut. On the Great South Bay, passenger ferries take vacationers to and from Fire Island. The ferry terminals in Patchogue lead to the communities of Davis Park, and Watch Hill Visitor's Center, on the western edge of the Otis Pike Fire Island High Dune Wilderness Area. Bellport also has a ferry leading to Bellport Beach on Fire Island.

From Fire Island itself, communities have ferries from Fire Island Pines and Cherry Grove, both of which are popular vacation spots for LGBT tourists as well as the Sailors Haven Visitor's Center, which is located within the Sunken Forest Visitor's Center. All three ferries lead to Sayville in the Town of Islip. Ocean Bay Park is the westernmost community in the Town of Brookhaven, and ferries from there lead to Bay Shore.

Airports
The town of Brookhaven contains three minor reliever airports, all of which are in south shore communities. The first one is the Brookhaven Calabro Airport in Shirley. East of this is the Spadaro Airport and Lufker Airport both of which are in East Moriches, and both of which share a taxiway. Coram Airport was operational until 1984.

Notable people 
Alfred Charles Garratt
Tapping Reeve

See also

National Register of Historic Places listings in Brookhaven (town), New York

References

External links

 Town of Brookhaven official website

 
Towns on Long Island
Towns in Suffolk County, New York
Towns in the New York metropolitan area
Populated coastal places in New York (state)